The Middle of the World may refer to one of the following films:

 The Middle of the World (1974 film), a Swiss-French romance film by Alain Tanner
 The Middle of the World (2003 film), a Brazilian drama film by Vicente Amorim

See also
 Mitad del Mundo (disambiguation)
 Center of the World (disambiguation)